The 1947–48 Harvard Crimson men's ice hockey season was the 48th season of play for the program. The Crimson represented Harvard University and were coached by John Chase in his 4th season.

Season
After having played just 20 games over the previous 2 seasons, Harvard was ready to finally shake off the last vestiges of World War II by putting together a 22-game slate, the most ambitious in the history of the program. Before the first game could be played, however, the Crimson encountered problems. One of the team's starting defensemen, Charlie Coulter, contracted viral pneumonia and would be out until after Christmas. His partner, Lou Preston, who was talented enough to be a candidate for the US Olympic Team, was then placed on probation and would be unavailable until after the mid-year exams. Without his top two blueliners, coach Chase had to rearrange the defense quickly for the team's opening games. Luckily for Harvard, Boston College was dealing with roster problems of their own while Brown was playing its first game in 9 years. This enabled the Crimson to open the year with a pair of wins. 

Harvard's aspirations were diminished in after the third game when Harvard was thumped by Boston University but the team had the chance to show how good it was with a subsequent 5-game road trip that would tame them through Canada and out into the Midwest. The trip could hardly have gone worse for the Crimson as the team lost all 5 games and most by sizable margins. To make matters worse, John Crocker and Bill Yetman were injured during the trip and unable to compete in the final few games.

With the season spiraling out of control, coach Chase reshuffled the lines, moving Shawn McKean to the top unit with Dave Key and Wally Sears. With Dick Greeley holding the back end with the rest of the defensive corps, the offense stepped to the fore and helped Harvard arrest its slide by scoring 28 goals over two a two-game stretch. After an extended layoff, the scoring continued at a high pace in early February and nearly enabled the Crimson to reach .500.

While the team's 6-game losing streak meant that it would be nearly impossible for the Crimson to earn an NCAA tournament bid, the team could still play spoiler for other hopefuls as it sought to finish out she season strong. Unfortunately, Harvard had not been able to fully resolve its defensive issues and lost three consecutive games, all while averaging 5 goals themselves. After brief interlude when they defeated Williams, Harvard lost another trio of games and sat dead last in the Pentagonal League standings.

The team's final home stand in March saw the defense stiffen and hold Princeton to 2 goals. The following game, which was initially slated to be the last of the season, provided the Crimson with a 1–0 victory over Yale, the team's only shutout on the season. Because the season series with the Elis was a draw, a final rubber match between the two was added and took place the following week. The game turned out to be more of a brawl than a hockey game with both teams complaining about the lack of officiating. While Yale was the better team on the ice, tempers were running high all night and several fights broke out between the two teams. With just 75 seconds remaining in the match, Dave Abbott and Artie Moher got into a confrontation in front of the Yale cage. After being told to go to their respective locker rooms, the two reengaged and Abbott was hit in the mouth Moher's stick. He had to be taken to the local hospital where he received 12 stitches. In order to prevent further chaos, coach Chase pulled his players off of the ice and ended the game prematurely. While it was unclear at the time as to whether or not the game would be ruled a forfeit, eventually the final score was allowed to stand at 10–3 for Yale.

Roster

Standings

Schedule and results

|-
!colspan=12 style=";" | Regular Season

† Match ended with 75 seconds remaining in the game due to a brawl.

References

Harvard Crimson men's ice hockey seasons
Harvard
Harvard
Harvard
Harvard